Michel Arpin (28 December 1935 – 30 May 2015) was a French alpine skier. He competed in the men's slalom at the 1964 Winter Olympics.

References

1935 births
2015 deaths
French male alpine skiers
Olympic alpine skiers of France
Alpine skiers at the 1964 Winter Olympics
Sportspeople from Savoie